Janet Holmes is an American poet and professor. She was the director of Ahsahta Press. She is the author of six poetry collections, most recently The    ms of  m  y    kin (Shearsman Books, 2009). Her poems were published in literary journals including American Poetry Review, Beloit Poetry Journal, Boulevard, Carolina Quarterly, Georgia Review, Michigan Quarterly Review, MiPoesias, Nimrod, Pleiades, Poetry, Prairie Schooner, and in anthologies including The Best American Poetry 1994 and The Best American Poetry 1995. Her honors include the Minnesota Book Award and fellowships from Yaddo and the MacDowell Colony. She earned her B.A. from Duke University and her M.F.A. from Warren Wilson College. She taught at Boise State University.

Published works 
Full-length collections
 The    ms of  m  y    kin (Shearsman Books, 2009)
 F2F (University of Notre Dame Press, 2006)
 Humanophone (University of Notre Dame Press, 2001)
 The Green Tuxedo (University of Notre Dame Press, 1998)
 The Physicist at the Mall (Anhinga Press, 1994)

Chapbooks
 Paperback Romance (State Street Press, 1984)

Honors and awards 
 1999 Chad Walsh Poetry Prize from Beloit Poetry Journal
 1999 Minnesota Book Award
 1998 Poetry Book of the Year from ForeWord Magazine
 1997 Pablo Neruda Award from Nimrod International Journal of Prose & Poetry
 1996 Ernest Sandeen Prize in Poetry
 1993 Anhinga Prize
 1984 State Street Press Chapbook Award

References

Sources 
 Boise State University > English Department Faculty Profile > Janet Holmes
 Library of Congress Online Catalog > Janet Holmes

External links 
 Poems: Beloit Poetry Journal > Winter 2011, Vol. 61, No. 2 > Janet Holmes
 Review: Valparisio Poetry Review > Review by Halvard Johnson of The Green Tuxedo by Janet Holmes
 Review: The Cortland Review > Issue 37 > Review by Lesley Wheeler of F2F by Janet Holmes
 Self Interview/Blog Feature: Harriet the Blog: The Poetry Foundation > Janet Holmes Writes About Ahsahta Press, Publishing & Writing
 Author Page: University of Notre Dame Press > Janet Holmes >  F2F
 Author Page: Anhinga Press > Janet Holmes > The Physicist at the Mall
 Author Website > Janet Holmes

Living people
Poets from Idaho
Duke University alumni
Warren Wilson College alumni
American publishers (people)
American book editors
Year of birth missing (living people)
American women poets
21st-century American women
Electronic literature writers